"Without You I'm Nothing" is a 1999 single by British alternative rock band Placebo. The title track of their second album, the single version featured additional vocals by David Bowie. The single reached number 79 on the French Singles Chart, and number 52 on the Australian ARIA singles chart.

This song was also featured in an episode of Queer as Folk and the mexican movie Amor, Dolor y Viceversa (Love, Pain and, Vice versa).

Live performance history
The song was a staple of the band's set list from the Without You I'm Nothing tour to the Sleeping with Ghosts tour. It was also performed during the latter legs of the Meds tour. The song returned to live shows during the band's UK tour in April 2012, but was not performed during the Summer leg of the tour. It was also featured in the 2016 arena tour with accompanying visuals of Bowie working with the band to produce the track.

Track listing
Enhanced CD (UK)
"Without You I'm Nothing" (Single Mix) - 4:16
"Without You I'm Nothing" (UNKLE mix) - 5:08
"Without You I'm Nothing" (Flexirol mix) - 9:26
"Without You I'm Nothing" (BIR mix) - 10:53

CD (Europe)
"Without You I'm Nothing" (Single Mix) - 4:16
"Without You I'm Nothing" (UNKLE mix) - 5:08

12" (UK)
"Without You I'm Nothing" (UNKLE mix) - 5:08
"Without You I'm Nothing" (Flexirol mix) - 9:26
"Without You I'm Nothing" (BIR mix) - 10:53

Chart performance

References

Placebo (band) songs
Vocal collaborations
1998 songs
Virgin Records singles
1999 singles
Songs written by Steve Hewitt
Songs written by Brian Molko
Songs written by Stefan Olsdal